The 1973 IAAF World Race Walking Cup was held in Lugano, Switzerland, on October 12–13, 1973.  The event was also known as Lugano Trophy.

Complete results were published.

Medallists

Results

Men's 20 km

Men's 50 km

Team
The team rankings, named Lugano Trophy, combined the 20km and 50km events team results.

Participation
The participation of 68 athletes from 9 countries is reported.

 (4)
 (8)
 (8)
 (8)
 (8)
 (8)
 (8)
 (8)
 (8)

Qualifying rounds 
From 1961 to 1985 there were qualifying rounds with the first two winners proceeding to the final.  This year, the German Democratic Republic, the Soviet Union, the Federal Republic of Germany, the United States, and Canada proceeded directly to the final.

Zone 1
Borås, Sweden, September 8/9

Zone 2
Gradisca d'Isonzo, Italy, September 9

References

World Athletics Race Walking Team Championships
World Race Walking Cup
International athletics competitions hosted by Switzerland
World Race Walking Cup